Irma Garcia is the athletics director at St. Francis College. When she took the job in 2007, Garcia was the country's first Latina athletic director in NCAA Division I sports.

Early life and education

Garcia was raised in a Catholic-Puerto Rican family in Brooklyn and has seven siblings. She attended St. Angela Hall High School in Brooklyn, New York. In 1976, she enrolled in St. Francis College and played women's basketball for coach Dianne Nolan.  Upon graduation in 1980, Garcia taught physical education and coached girls' basketball at St. Joseph by the Sea High School on Staten Island.  In 1988, she returned to be the head coach at St. Francis College. After 11 seasons, she stopped coaching and was hired as the associate athletics director. In 2001, while she was the associate athletic director at St. Francis, Garcia earned her master's degree from Brooklyn College in sports administration.

Head coaching career

Administrative career

In 2007, Garcia became the athletic director of the Terriers replacing longtime director Edward Aquilone. At the time of her hire and as of 2010, she was the country's only female Latina athletic director in Division I sports. For the 2014–15 academic year, Garcia was named  NACWAA D1 (FCS) Administrator of the Year. The award was in part because of the Terriers success in Men's Soccer (NEC Champions and NCAA Tournament Participants), Men's Basketball (NEC Regular Season Champions and NIT Participants) and Women's Basketball (NEC Champions and NCAA Tournament Participants).

During Garcia's tenure as director of athletic the St. Francis College Athletics program changed their brand from St. Francis (NY) to St. Francis Brooklyn. The College previously came to be known as St. Francis (NY) when the athletics program joined the Division I Northeast Conference in 1981. In 2018 it was announced that women's soccer and men's volleyball would be added as sports programs to the existing 19 teams at St. Francis College. Both teams will begin play in the 2019–20 school year, with women's soccer starting in fall 2019 and men's volleyball in spring 2020.

References

External links
 St. Francis Brooklyn Profile

Living people
American sportspeople of Puerto Rican descent
Year of birth missing (living people)
Brooklyn College alumni